Jinggang is a town in  Wangcheng district, Changsha, Hunan province, China. The town is located on the west bank of Xiang river, and bordered by Qiaokou to the north, Zhuliangqiao and Shuangjiangkou of Ningxiang to the west, Gaotangling to the south, Tongguan across the Xiang river to the east. The Jinggang town was formed by the former Jinggang and Getang  towns on November 19, 2015. According to the result of 2016 adjustment programmes on village-level divisions, the town has two residential communities and 10 villages under its jurisdiction; the administrative office is at Nongxi village.

History

Jinggang, also known as "Weigang", is located at the northwest of Wangcheng District and was named so due to the general of Tang dynasty (618–907) Li Jing's (571–649) stationing here. Jinggang was firstly mentioned in National Chorography, which read: "Tang dynasty Li Jing fought against Xiao Xian stationing troops here."  In the Xianfeng period (1850–1861) of Qing dynasty (1644–1911), the Xiang Army led by Zeng Guofan (1811–1872) fought against the Taiping Army here. According to the Changsha County Annals, the book described Jinggang as "Tang dynasty Li Jing station troops here, the army doesn't commit the slightest offence against the civilians, the local people are very nostalgic for him and named the place after him." From the Ming and Qing dynasties (1368–1911) to the Republican period (1912–1949), Jinggang was the well-known rice market in Hunan and distribution port of Huai salt. It was one of the four rice market in Hunan and known as "Little Hankou". By the end of 19th century, Jianggang had been over 90 rice shops, five money exchange shops, and numerous handicraft workshops and scissor-cut, woodworking, manual scale, iron forging, paper umbrella, manufacturing and other handicraft industries gave full play to their respective strong point. Nearly all families on Granite Street were shops, the permanent resident population reached 40,000 and transient population exceeded 10,000. In 2008, Jinggang was rated as one of the 4th batch of "Historic and Cultural Towns in China".

Subdivision
On March 23, 2016, the village-level divisions of Jinggang were adjusted from 16 to 12. There 10 villages and two residential community in the town.

Attractions
Jianggang is home to Yangsi Tower, Guanyin Temple and Ziyun Palace. Guanyin Temple is a Buddhist temple and Ziyun Palace is a Taoist temple in the town. Underground CPC Hunan Provincial Committee Office Site, Former Residence of Liu Chouxi, Former Residence of Tao Cheng are also famous scenic spots.

References

Bibliography
 
 A Millennium Historic Town: Jinggang 
 
 
 

Township-level divisions of Wangcheng
Wangcheng